This is a list of South Carolina heritage preserves managed by the South Carolina Department of Natural Resources.

 Aiken Gopher Tortoise Heritage Preserve/Wildlife Management Area
 Altamaha Towne Heritage Preserve
 Ashmore Heritage Preserve/WMA
 Bald Rock Heritage Preserve
 Bay Point Shoal Seabird Sanctuary
 Bear Branch Heritage Preserve
 Belvue Springs Heritage Preserve
 Bennett's Bay Heritage Preserve
 Bird Key - Stono Seabird Sanctuary
 Blackwell Heritage Preserve
 Botanty Bay Plantation Heritage Preserve/WMA
 Brasstown Creek Heritage Preserve/WMA
 Bunched Arrowhead Heritage Preserve
 Buzzard Island Heritage Preserve
 Buzzard Roost Heritage Preserve/WMA
 Capers Island Heritage Preserve
 Cartwheel Bay Heritage Preserve/WMA
 Cathedral Bay Heritage Preserve
 Chestnut Ridge Heritage Preserve/WMA
 Childsbury Towne Heritage Preserve
 Clear Creek Heritage Preserve
 Congaree Bluffs Heritage Preserve
 Congaree Creek Heritage Preserve
 Crab Bank Seabird Sanctuary
 Crosby Oxypolis Heritage Preserve
 Daws Island Heritage Preserve
 Deveaux Bank Seabird Sanctuary
 Ditch Pond Heritage Preserve/WMA
 Dungannon Plantation Heritage Preserve/WMA
 Eastatoe Creek Heritage Preserve/WMA
 Eva Russell Chandler Heritage Preserve/WMA
 Fort Frederick Heritage Preserve
 Fort Lamar Heritage Preserve
 Forty Acre Rock Heritage Preserve/WMA
 Glassy Mountain Heritage Preserve
 Gopher Branch Heritage Preserve
 Great Pee Dee River Heritage Preserve/WMA
 Green's Shell Enclosure Heritage Preserve
 Henderson Heritage Preserve/WMA
 Janet Harrison High Pond Heritage Preserve
 Joiner Bank Seabird Sanctuary
 Laurel Fork Heritage Preserve/WMA
 Lewis Ocean Bay Heritage Preserve
 Lighthouse Inlet Heritage Preserve
 Little Pee Dee Heritage Preserve/WMA
 Little Pee Dee State Park Bay Heritage Preserve
 Long Branch Bay Heritage Preserve
 Longleaf Pine Heritage Preserve/WMA
 Lynchburg Savanna Heritage Preserve/WMA
 Nipper Creek Heritage Preserve
 North Santee Bar Seabird Sanctuary
 Old Island Heritage Preserve/WMA
 Pacolet River Heritage Preserve
 Peachtree Rock Heritage Preserve
 Peters Creek Heritage Preserve
 Poinsett Bridge Heritage Preserve
 Rock Hill Blackjacks Heritage Preserve/WMA
 Savage Bay Heritage Preserve
 Savannah River Bluffs Heritage Preserve
 Segars-McKinnon Heritage Preserve
 Shealy's Pond Heritage Preserve
 South Bluff Heritage Preserve
 St. Helena Sound Heritage Preserve
 Stevens Creek Heritage Preserve/WMA
 Stoney Creek Battery Heritage Preserve
 Stumphouse Mountain Heritage Preserve/WMA
 Tillman Sand Ridge Heritage Preserve/WMA
 Tom Yawkey Wildlife Center Heritage Preserve
 Victoria Bluff Heritage Preserve/WMA
 Waccamaw River Heritage Preserve
 Wadakoe Mountain Heritage Preserve/WMA
 Wateree Heritage Preserve/WMA
 Watson-Cooper Heritage Preserve/WMA
 Woods Bay Heritage Preserve

References

External links
 Heritage Preserves - South Carolina Department of Natural Resources

Heritage Preserves
Heritage Preserves
Heritage Preserves